When Brummies Met Sindhis is a documentary film made by Pakistani documentary filmmaker, Azfar Rizvi.

Synopsis
The film follows five British schoolteachers from Birmingham, England in their journey to Pakistan as part of a British Council Pakistan project, commonly known as Connecting Classrooms.  The plethora of inter-cultural dialogue that ensues as the two cultures disclose both tradition and practice under the umbrella of education, transforms a simple visit to Bhit Shah, Sindh into a mutually beneficent exchange.

The Film
Rebecca Bailey is a schoolteacher at the Hill West Primary School.  Kamal Hanif and Ian Healey are the Head and Assistant Head teachers respectively at the Waverley School, West Midlands.  Heather Hepworth and Sheila Holden are Assistant Head and Deputy Head teachers respectively at the Calthorpe Special School.  The film records the experiences and the change in perception of these five schoolteachers that have come to Pakistan as part of Connecting Classrooms – a British Council Pakistan project that facilitates inter-cultural dialogue, and especially, an understanding of the different teaching styles employed in the UK and that of other countries.

Not knowing what to expect, the British schoolteachers are at first most excited about learning from and working with each other, as under no other circumstances would the three schools be able to come together and exchange ideas. Finding the same hustle bustle at 4 in the morning at the Jinnah International Airport as the plane lands in Karachi that they would at 8 pm in Birmingham kick-starts the series of experiences and discoveries that this documentary explores. The traditions and customs of Sindh serve as the contextual framework to what they learn about education in Pakistan, how they interact with its peoples, and the many ways in which they embrace its culture.

Following an introductory meeting with the Office of District Government Matiari, the British schoolteachers visit several public schools in the vicinity, including one for children with mental disabilities. They discover that teaching styles are more direct in Pakistan, with an ‘I talk, you listen’ approach as opposed to ‘let us do it together’ that is used in the UK. One look at the children’s report cards, however, ascertains the effectiveness of this approach in the results that appear to be just as good. An emphasis on discipline surfaces as a common feature in all the individual opinions expressed, when inquired about the school visits.

The documentary segregates the experiences of these teachers into two major categories. The first category can be characterized as the material artifacts such as ceramic wares, Ajrak – a special kind of blockprinted shawl that serves as a symbol, woodwork, and bangles that represent Sindh’s outer surface. This also includes rides on a Bullock cart, an Auto rikshaw, and the public bus which is world-famous for ornamental art on the outside as well as the inside. Rebecca Bailey volunteers to try everything from making and painting intricate pottery to taking a ride on a public bus that is crowded enough to burst at the seams.

The second category can be characterized as general culture and the value system that exhibits the land’s deep-rooted core. Generosity - especially the manner in which gifts are exchanged, a sense of community found almost everywhere, the significance of keeping tradition alive, being one with nature, a fusion of both Hindu and Muslim religions – illustrated in the shrine at Dera Lal, marketplaces that never sleep are just some of the aspects highlighted upon by the British schoolteachers.

There is greater substance in this film than just a cultural exchange. When Brummies Met Sindhis taps into the human being’s ability to connect with another human being, irrespective of race, creed, religion, profession, or location even.

Background

The British Council Pakistan
The British Council Pakistan's primary objective is to facilitate educational and cultural relations between the UK and Pakistan. Established in 1948, the Council has services available in Islamabad, Karachi, Lahore, Peshawar, Faisalabad, Multan, and Quetta.

Its efforts have borne fruit at the individual level, in the form of building relationships between both people and institutions, as well as at state level by improving the relationship between the two countries. Learning, professional networking, and youth-based special activities are just some of the ways in which this is achieved.

Connecting Classrooms
Connecting Classrooms is one such endeavour. Under this global program, partner schools in the UK and Pakistan collaborate on curriculum tasks. Their school leaders and teachers are given professional development. These schools are also eligible to undertake measures that will provide them with an International School Award accreditation. Teachers can participate in global networking with other teachers through online communities.

Sindh
A traditional home to the Sindhis in Pakistan, today the province of Sindh it also has large number of Urdu-speaking population. The independence of Pakistan gave way to the Muslim culture into this land, as the Muslim refugees started to settle here. Celebrated for giving rise to the Indus Valley civilization, Sindh has a rich cultural heritage encompassing varied eras of influence by the Persian Achaemenid Empire, Alexander the Great, the Seleucid rule, the Mauryan Empire, the Shunga Dynasty, the Greek rule, the Indo-Greek Kingdom, Scythian tribes, the Tocharian Kushan Empire, the Sassanid Empire of Persia, Kidarites, the Hephthalite tribes, the Rai Dynasty, the Umayyad Caliphate, the Soomra Dynasty, the Samma Dynasty, the Mughal Empire, and finally, the British Raj. All these empires have left their mark somewhere in Sindhi traditions and customs.

Reception
As a multiple, first-person narrative the film received positive review by renowned Pakistani journalist and writer Bina Shah in the Pakistani newspaper Dawn, where Shah called it "a fantastic documentary".

References

External links
 - Official Site
Central South Asia Connecting Classrooms
Connecting classrooms to connect cultures, Dawn Newspaper
Government of Sindh, Official WebPortal
'Inspirational Fair' for students by the British council
Institute of Sindhology
Respecting Sindh, Dawn Newspaper
When Brummies Met Sindhis, Chris Swift

English-language Pakistani films
South Asian diaspora
Pakistani documentary films
Films set in Sindh
Documentary films about education
Pakistan–United Kingdom relations
Mass media in Sindh
2009 films